Montserrado-7 is an electoral district for the elections to the House of Representatives of Liberia. The district covers the township of West Point and downtown Monrovia (i.e the Centennial Area, Lynch/Center Streets, Mamba Point, Randall/Newport Streets, Randall/Lynch Streets, Rock Crusher, Snapper Hill, Sports Commission and BTC Area communities).

Elected representatives

References

Electoral districts in Liberia